The Mohegan Bluffs are large clay cliffs about  high, located on the southern shore of Block Island. They got their name because the battle of the Niantic and the Mohegan took place here in the mid 16th century. The battle was over supremacy of the island, and the intruding Mohegans were forced over the cliffs to their death by the native Niantic.

These cliffs are a beautiful site, and can be observed from the top, where visitors can look out for miles on the Atlantic Ocean or visitors can climb down the steep staircase of over 100 steps and view them from the beach (also known as Corn Cove).

The visiting times are from a half-hour before sunrise to a half-hour after sunset. Visitors usually spend the day here tanning on the beach, swimming in the ocean, walking their dogs, or simply admiring the cliffs.

References

New Shoreham, Rhode Island
Landforms of Washington County, Rhode Island
Cliffs of the United States